Jack Murphy may refer to:

Politics
Jack Murphy (Irish politician) (1920–1984), Irish republican and independent politician
Jack M. Murphy (1925–1984), Republican Lieutenant Governor of Idaho
Jack Murphy (Communist) (1888–1965), British Communist Party foundation member
Jack Murphy (Georgia politician), state senator from Georgia (U.S. state)
Jack Murphy (Florida politician) (1926–1989), member of the Florida House of Representatives

Sports
Jack Murphy (footballer) (1918–2002), Australian rules footballer
Jack Murphy (sportswriter) (1923–1980), American sportswriter
Jack Murphy Stadium a former stadium in San Diego, California, which was named for the sportswriter and later changed names
Jack Murphy (American football) (1932–2021), American football player and coach
Jack Murphy (basketball) (born 1979), American basketball coach
Jack Murphy (baseball) (born 1988), American baseball player
Jack Murphy (rugby league) (born 1992), English rugby league player
Jack Murphy (cricketer) (born 1995), Welsh cricketer
Jack Murphy (lacrosse), lacrosse player
Jackie Murphy (1949–1970), Scottish football player (Notts County)

Others
Jack Roland Murphy (1937–2020), aka Murph the Surf, American convicted robber and murderer
Jack Murphy (writer), musical lyricist and composer

See also
John Murphy (disambiguation)